The city of Chipata is the administrative centre of the Eastern Province of Zambia and Chipata District. It was declared the 5th city of the country, after Lusaka, Ndola, Kitwe and Livingstone, by President Edgar Lungu on 24 February 2017. The city has undergone rapid economic and infrastructure growth in the years, leading up to city status.

Location
The geographical coordinates of Chipata are 13°38'43.0"S, 32°38'47.0"E (Latitude:13°38'43.0"S; Longitude:32°38'47.0"E).

Overview
Having a modern market, a central hospital, shopping malls, a university, some colleges and a number of schools, Chipata is the business and administrative hub of the region. The town boasts a four star hotel, a golf course, an airport, and a "welcome arch". Developed areas includes Kalongwezi, Moth, and Little Bombay.

Chipata is the regional head of the Ngoni of Zambia. The Ngoni adopted the languages of the tribes they conquered, so Chewa and Nsenga are the principal languages, although Tumbuka and English are widely spoken, plus some Indian languages, as a large number of Zambian Indians live in the town. It is located near the border with Malawi, and lies on the Great East Road which connects the capitals Lilongwe  to the east, and Lusaka  to the west. It is a popular access point for the South Luangwa National Park.

History 
Chipata's name comes from the Chewa word "Chimpata" meaning "large space", in reference to the town's situation in a shallow valley between hills. The name of the central neighbourhood of Kapata, the original centre of town, comes from the Chewa word meaning "small space."

Chipata was formerly known as Fort Jameson (and informally as "Fort Jimmy"), being named after Sir Leander Starr Jameson, the 19th-century British politician and adventurer. Even during the colonial period, few supported that Jameson, who is mainly known for his part in the infamous Jameson Raid, fully deserved the honour of having any town named after him. Like 'Fort Manning' and 'Fort Rosebery', Fort Jameson was called a "fort" because the local government offices, or "Boma", were once fortified.

Fort Jameson was the capital of the British protectorate of North-Eastern Rhodesia between 1900 and 1911.

Government 
The mayor of the city of Chipata is the head of the city government.

Population
With a population of about 455,783 in 2010, the Chipata district is believed to be the 3rd largest district of the country. The city of Chipata had 116.600 inhabitants in 2010. The predominant ethnic groups in the city are the Chewa, Tumbuka, Ngoni and Nsenga.

Economy 

Chipata is the primary transport hub for trade  between Zambia and Malawi. "Down Shops" is Chipata's bustling down-town area, most shops and other businesses having proprietors of Indian origin. Two notable shops are Kavulamungu Bargain Centre, and Ally & Sons.

Tourism 
The Nc'wala ceremony of the Ngoni people takes place at Mutenguleni on the outskirts of Chipata. The ceremony celebrates the first fruits harvest and is usually held at the end of February.

Hospitality

Chipata has five Hotels and several guest houses and lodges dotted across the city that meets international standards.
Some of the notable places of accommodation in Chipata include Protea Hotel a three-star Hotel that has been in the city for over 10 years. Crystal Springs Hotel about 1.5km away from town centre as you go towards Malawi is another Hotel with excellent Conference Halls and Swimming pool facilities. It has been in operation for over 25 years. Nyamfinzi Hotel, Fort Jameson and Luangwa House operated by Hostels Board of Zambia.

Other notable guest Houses and Lodges include; 
• Dean's Hillview Lodge 
• Eastern Comfort Lodge 
• Pineview Guest House 
• La Rochelle 
• Franklin Gardens 
• Jemita Guest House 
• Dredel Lodge 
• Travel Lodge 
• Golf Rest House 
• Chiwayu Guest House 
• Yanja Lodge 
• Mama Rula's campsite 
• Kigelia Campsite 
• Mwana Chanda Lodge 
• Mukels Lodge 
• Fort Young's Lodge 
• Chikhute Guest House 
• Wise Donkey Guest House 
• Roadside Guest House 
• Sunnyside Lodge 
• Katuta Lodge 
• Crossroads Lodges 
• Gloka Guest House 
• Calmrest Lodge 
• Mercury one Lodge 
• CTV Lodge 
• Streamside Guest House 
• Chipata Motel 
• VNT Motel 
• Tilandile Guest House 
• Murphy Guest House 
• Hom's cottage  
• Rombando Executive Lodge 
• Chansolo Lodge 
• Malent 
• Escape view Lodge 
• New Horizon view Lodge 
• Eastlands Lodge 
• Redmont Guest House 
• Chatowa Lodge 
• Kum'mawa Lodge

Transport 

An extension of the Sena railway, connecting the city of Chipata to the territory of Malawi (via Mchinji) was opened in August 2011. Chipata will now act as the Zambian railhead and entry point from Malawi and beyond. The route and alignment of the line has been laid out, including the site of Chipata station and the basic station building.

The route will provide an alternative to two existing rail routes to the Indian Ocean, at Dar es Salaam and Beira. In 2015 it was proposed to build a rail link to Serenje, a small town on the TAZARA Railway line.

Intra-city Transportation 

Residents in Chipata are serviced mainly by taxis which are mostly Toyota Corolla that transport people from one part of the city to another mostly on short distances. Another common mode of transport is the use of bicycles known as bicycle taxis. These carry passengers at relatively lower fares compared to vehicle taxi. Chipata City is known to the outside world due to its large use of bicycles. The large presence of bicycles can be attributed to the defunct Luangwa bicycle assembly plant that was located in the town back in 1990s. However bicycle taxis are slowly being phased out by motorcycles which have been mushrooming in the city at a very faster rate. Bicycles, motorcycles can take passengers almost anywhere including in places that may not be accessible by vehicles. 
Not only that, white Minibuses with a green ribbon(colour for Eastern province) around them locally known as "Bongo" have also been used as public transport in Chipata for almost 10 years. Bongos make up a reasonable percentage of the traffic volumes in Chipata. Bongos usually service high density residential areas by ferrying passengers from the city centre to suburbs and back. These are found in very limited streets because they mainly target residential areas with a lot of people such as Mchini, Navutika, Sido, Kapata and Magazine. Other areas are not serviced due to lack of target customers and absence of proper surfaced roads among other reasons. 
However lack of adherence to traffic rules by bus and taxi operators is a serious concern raised by Chipata residents. This include a large presence of unregistered, not roadworthy vehicles and motorcycles being allowed to operate on the roads and authorities have done little to enforce the law. Incidents of attacks and theft cases of motorcycles have also been reported in the recent past.

Inter District Transportation

Vehicle Taxis and Minibuses also take passengers to remote villages outside Chipata and other towns elsewhere in Eastern province. Transportation to Katete, Sinda, Petauke and Nyimba can be accessed at Lunkhwakwa bus station/near COMESA market. And those that go to Chadiza are based at Mbanyane Station. Transporters who go to Lundazi are found at Old welcome near Kobil Petrol station. And transportation to Mfuwe or South Luangwa is usually found at Kapata Main bus station.
Transporters that go to Mwami are found at Umodzi highway front opposite Saturday Market and Gondar Barracks station is at Highway bakers bus stop.

Rivers 
Chipata has four major streams pouring into the Luangwa river. The Luangwa river rises in the Lilonda and Mafinga Hills in north-east Zambia at an elevation of around 1500 meters near the border with Tanzania and Malawi, and flows in a southwesterly direction through a broad valley. The water from the streams and the Luangwa river is used for farming by the inhabitants around the district.

Soil and Vegetation 
There are three main soil types namely Acrisols, Fersiallitic soils, and Lithosols. There are four vegetation types, the main one being the Brachystegia (Miombo) woodland and Munga vegetation types.

Climate

Schools & Colleges

Primary education 
 SPS (Shakespeare private school)
 Hillside Primary School
 Mpezeni Primary School
 Chipata Primary School
 Kapata Primary School
 Chongololo School
 St Anne's Primary School
 Trinity private School
 Mem private School
Lunkwakwa Primary school
St. Betty Primary school
Munga Primary school
Mchini Primary school
Nadalisika primary school
Msekera primary school
Walela Primary school
Madaliso Primary school
Crownhill School

Secondary education 
 Anoya Zulu Boys Secondary School
 Chizongwe Technical Secondary School
 St. Monicas Girls Secondary School
 Chipata Day Secondary School 
 Hillside Girls High School 
 St. Atanazio Secondary School 
 St. Mary's Seminary School
 Damview Secondary School
 Muziphas high school
Katopola Day secondary school
Kanjala Day secondary school
St. Magrets Girls secondary school
Lutembwe Day secondary school
Mazimoyo Day Secondary school
Gondar Day secondary school

Tertiary education 
 Chipata Teacher's Training College
 Chipata Trades Training Institute
 Chipata School of Nursing
 DMI-St. Eugene University

Suburbs 
 Kalongwezi
 Kalongwezi Extension 
 Kapata
 Umodzi
 Moth
 Muchini
 Nabvutika
 Little Bombay
 Mchenga
 Damview
 Old Gym
 New Gym
 Chimwemwe  
 Magazine 
 Eastrise
 Walela
 Chawama
 Munga
 Chipata Motel 
 Nadalitsika
 Katopola
 Maferendum 
 Rose
 Hillview
 Gash
 Msekera
 Messengers
David Kaunda area
Hollywood
Kalongola site and service
Hillview
Chimzere
Gondar Barracks
Highlands
Aslot

See also 
 Railway stations in Zambia
 Railway stations in Malawi
 Transport in Zambia
 Transport in Malawi

References

External links 

 UN Map
 Largest cities of Zambia

 
Populated places in Eastern Province, Zambia
Capitals of former nations
Provincial capitals in Zambia
Chipata District